Orthaga aenescens is a species of snout moth in the genus Orthaga. It is known from India (including Darjiling and Sikkim).

This species is olive-green, irrorated with black and has a wingspan of 30–32 mm.

Biology
Known host-plants of this species are Litsea glutinosa and  Cinnamomum sp. (Lauraceae).

References

Moths described in 1888
Epipaschiinae
Endemic fauna of India